Tetramerorhinus is an extinct genus of proterotheriid litoptern that lived during the Early and Middle Miocene in what is now Argentina and Peru.

Description

This animal resembled a small horse, with slender, elongated legs. The body was approximately a meter long, and it is supposed to have weighed between 30 to 50 kilograms. The skull had a relatively elongated snout, with nasal bones longer than Diadiaphorus and with less developed upper incisors. The orbits were positioned near the middle of the skull. The molars had lower crowns than those of more derived proterotheriids, such as Proterotherium.

The endocranial cast of a specimen of Tetramerorhinus lucarius has been preserved, which allowed to reconstruct certain structures of the animal's brain. The brain was quite large relatively to the size of the skull, due to the development, especially in the anterior part, of the neocortex, and to the complexity of the cerebellum. The olfactory lobes were small and separated by a deep notch, while the cerebellum was elongated and separated from the two cerebral hemispheres by a deep and narrow depression. The rhinencephalon was highly developed, and the piriform lobes were in a much less lateral position than those of archaic ungulates such as Phenacodus, and presented a sort of circular depression of unknown significance. Numerous longitudinal grooves covered the surface of the neocortex. The cranial nerves were unusually arranged relatively to those of other ungulates, and the foramen ovale was posterior to the tentorium osseum.

Classification

The genus Tetramerorhinus was first described in 1894 by Florentino Ameghino, based on fossil remains found in Early Miocene deposits in Patagonia. Numerous species have been ascribed to this genus, such as Tetramerorhinus cingulatum, T. fleaglei, T. mixtum, T. lucarius, T. prosisttens.

Tetramerorhinus is a proterotheriid, a group of litopterns with characteristics similar to those of equids, although they were not closely related. Tetramerorhinus seems to have been a derived form, closely related to Anisolophus and Proterotherium.

Below is a phylogenetic tree of the Proterotheriidae, based on the work of McGrath et al. 2020.

 }}

References

Proterotheriids
Miocene mammals of South America
Neogene Argentina
Fossils of Argentina
Neogene Peru
Fossils of Peru
Laventan
Colloncuran
Friasian
Santacrucian
Colhuehuapian
Fossil taxa described in 1894
Taxa named by Florentino Ameghino
Prehistoric placental genera
Golfo San Jorge Basin
Sarmiento Formation
Austral or Magallanes Basin
Santa Cruz Formation